Kolonia Starorawska  is a village in the administrative district of Gmina Nowy Kawęczyn, within Skierniewice County, Łódź Voivodeship, in central Poland.

References

Kolonia Starorawska